= CitiesByDiana =

American internet personality

citiesbydiana
- Born: Diana Regan
- Occupation: Comedian
- Years active: 2020–present

Instagram information
- Page: citiesbydiana
- Genre: Comedy
- Followers: 249 thousand

TikTok information
- Page: citiesbydiana
- Genre: Comedy
- Followers: 184.5 thousand

YouTube information
- Channel: CitiesByDiana
- Genre: Comedy
- Subscribers: 79.9 thousand
- Views: 3.4 million
- Last updated: November 12, 2025

Diana Regan, better known as CitiesByDiana, is an American content creator and satirist.

Originally from Fresno, she moved to the San Francisco Bay Area in 2013, and is now based in Oakland.

She is best known for her surreal and satirical videos that critique American imperialism, urban planning, suburban sprawl, and car-focused infrastructure.
